Ellen Bry is an American actress. She is best known for her portrayal of nurse-turned-vigilante Shirley Daniels on the hospital drama St. Elsewhere.

Bry gained acting experience in school plays, community theater productions, and summer stock theatre. At one point, she left acting and worked as a paralegal for New York City's Department of Consumer Affairs. A scripted fight on an episode of Kojak led to Bry's working for a while as a stuntwoman in New York.

Bry also appeared as medical student Jean Hallinan in three episodes of the television series Dallas (Season Four, 1981) and as photographer Julie Masters on the 1978 CBS series The Amazing Spider-Man.

Bry's family moved to Stamford, Connecticut, when she was a child.

Filmography

References

External links

American film actresses
American television actresses
Living people
Actresses from Connecticut
20th-century American actresses
21st-century American women
Year of birth missing (living people)